Jean-Jacques Feuchère (24 August 1807 – 26 July 1852) was a French sculptor.

He was a student of Jean-Pierre Cortot, and among his students was Jacques-Léonard Maillet.

Selected works 

 Relief panel Le Pont d'Arcole, Arc de Triomphe, Paris, 1833–1834
 Satan, bronze; dated 1833 (Musée du Louvre). Another example is in the collections of the Royal Museums of Fine Arts of Belgium, Brussels.
 pediment sculpture, Church of St. Denys du Saint-Sacrement in Paris, 3rd arrondissement, for architect Étienne-Hippolyte Godde, 1835
 Portrait statue of the Marquis of Stafford, bronze 1837. (Dunrobin Castle)
 Amazon Taming a Horse, bronze; dated 1843. (Musée du Louvre); an undated bronze is at the Cleveland Museum of Art.
 La Loi (The Law), Place du Palais-Bourbon, Paris. Installed in 1854
 Arab Warrior on the Pont d'Iéna, Paris
 Fontaine Cuvier, rue Cuvier, Paris
  Seated Michelangelo, bronze
 Jeanne d'Arc, Hôtel de ville, Rouen
 La Madeleine, Paris

References

External links 

 Jean-Jacques Feuchère on-line
 

French architectural sculptors
1807 births
1852 deaths
19th-century French sculptors
French male sculptors
19th-century French male artists